Alan Khazbiyevich Agayev (born 31 March 1977) is a Russian former professional footballer.

Club career
He made his professional debut in the Russian Second Division in 1994 for FC Iriston Vladikavkaz.

Honours
 Russian Premier League champion: 1995.
 Russian Premier League runner-up: 1996.

European club competitions
With FC Alania Vladikavkaz.

 UEFA Champions League 1996–97 qualification: 2 games.
 UEFA Cup 1996–97: 2 games.
 UEFA Cup 1997–98: 3 games.

References

1977 births
Sportspeople from Vladikavkaz
Living people
Russian footballers
Russia under-21 international footballers
Association football midfielders
FC Spartak Vladikavkaz players
Russian Premier League players